Kanakatte is a village located in Arasikere taluk, Hassan district, Karnataka, India.

Etymology
Katte means a tank bund in Kannada Language and the name of the village is related to the big tank built in this village.

History
Kanakatte has a long recorded history, as demonstrated by the 15 epigraphs found in the village. Its earliest documented history can be traced to an inscription found at Arakere, a village in Arasikere taluk. It was earlier called Kalikatte,"Kanakatti","Kanakanakaatte" etc. It was also mentioned in several inscriptions belonging to Hoysala dynasties and was also called as "Vijayanarasimha pura" after setting up an Agrahara during 13th Century CE. The name of this village, Kalikatti figures prominently in various inscriptions of Hoysalas, a strong regional power of South India.

Kanakatte was also a headquarters of Singarasa, a local chieftain ruling at Arasikere, who shifted his headquarters from Arasikere to this place during 1132 CE.

An inscription of 1189 CE describes the villages as prosperous with rice fields, areca palms, water filled tanks and full of temples.

The tank of Kanakatte is very large compared to contemporary tanks of the area. The tank has a large history and inscriptions belonging to historic period mention this tank as well as its sluices.

Temples
Kanakatte has several historic temples, which are poorly maintained. The temples of this village have a long history, as several inscriptions belonging to 10th century CE to 12th century CE mention them. A local chieftain named Singarasa constructed a temple of Singeshwara (named after himself) during 1130 CE and donated lands to a Kalamukha priest to maintain Shiva temple. He also installed a linga in this village and named the temple as Bettadakalideva. Temples are also located on the banks of big tank and on a small island inside the tank.

Activity
This is a predominantly dry area and crops with low water requirements are grown. Main economic activity of Kanakatte is agriculture. Ragi, jowar and coconut are main crops.

Civic facilities
Kanakatte has a primary health centre run by the Government of Karnataka. Primary and high schools as well as a private college are established. A bank, police station and post office are located in the Hobli centre.

Transportation
Kanakatte is connected by an all-weather road to Arasikere, Chitradurga, Bangalore and other areas.

References

Villages in Hassan district